The Douglass Township Community Building is a community recreational auditorium and sports facility constructed in 1936, in Douglass, Kansas. It was designed by architect J. Hamilton. It was added to the National Register of Historic Places in 1995.

See also 
 National Register of Historic Places listings in Butler County, Kansas

References 

Government buildings completed in 1936
Buildings and structures in Butler County, Kansas
Government buildings on the National Register of Historic Places in Kansas
National Register of Historic Places in Butler County, Kansas